William Frank Reichenbach Sr. (December 18, 1923 – May 16, 2008) was an American jazz drummer and percussionist, who co-developed the jazz-samba drumming style. He was the father of trombonist Bill Reichenbach Jr. and the singer Kurt Reichenbach.

Life and career 
Reichenbach started his musical career even before he graduated from the McKinley Tech High School. During World War II, he played in a band of the Navy before he toured with the big bands of Tommy Dorsey, Jimmy Dorsey, and Art Mooney. Later he worked in the jazz clubs of his hometown, where he accompanied Frank Sinatra, Patti Page, Teddy Wilson, and Zoot Sims.

Charlie Byrd hired Reichenbach as an additional drummer for the Stan Getz album  Jazz Samba, which was recorded in 1962 and which provoked a wave of enthusiasm for Bossa Nova in the United States. In the course of 1962, he replaced Buddy Deppenschmidt in the trio of Byrd, of which he was a member for twelve years. Then he returned to work in Washington D.C., as the house drummer at the Blues Alley.

Reichenbach died following a series of strokes in Los Angeles, California, at the age of 84.

Discography
With Charlie Byrd
 Bossa Nova Pelos Passaros (Riverside, 1962)
 Jazz Samba (Verve, 1962)
 Byrd at the Gate (Riverside, 1963)
 Once More! Charlie Byrd's Bossa Nova (Riverside, 1963)
 Byrd Song (Riverside, 1964)
 Latin Impressions (Riverside, 1965)
 Byrdland (Columbia, 1966)
 Brazilian Byrd (Riverside, 1969)
 Byrd Man with Strings (Riverside, 1969)
 Let Go (Columbia, 1969)
 The Stroke of Genius (Columbia, 1971)
 For All We Know (Columbia, 1971)
 Crystal Silence (Fantasy, 1973)
 Latin Byrd (Milestone, 1973)
 In Greenwich Village (Milestone, 1978)

References

External links 

1923 births
2008 deaths
Musicians from Washington, D.C.
American jazz drummers
Mainstream jazz drummers
United States Navy personnel of World War II
20th-century American drummers
American male drummers
20th-century American male musicians
American male jazz musicians